The Texas Instruments Hex-Bus interface (sometimes used unhyphenated as Hex  Bus and with varying capitalization) was designed in 1982 and intended for commercial release in late 1983. It connects the console to peripherals via a high-speed serial link. Though it was prototypical to today's USB (plug and play, hot-swappable, etc.), it was never released, with only a small number of prototypes appearing in the hands of collectors after TI pulled out of the market. 

Several Hex-Bus peripherals were planned or produced. A WaferTape drive never made it past the prototype stage due to reliability issues with the tapes. The 5.25-inch Floppy drive also never made it past the prototype stage, even though it worked. Prototype DSDD disk controllers and video controllers were also made. A 4-color Printer-Plotter, a 300-baud modem, RS-232 interface, an 80-column thermal/ink printer, and a 2.8" "Quick Disk" drive were the only peripherals released in quantity, mostly for use with the TI CC-40. All Hex-Bus peripherals could be used with a TI-99/4A when connected through the Hex-Bus Interface, through direct connection to the TI-99/8, or through direct connection to the Compact Computer 40.

Devices
HX-1000 Printer/Plotter
HX-1010 Printer 80
HX-2000 Wafertape drive
HX-3000 RS-232 interface
HX-3100 Modem
HX-3200 Centronics Printer Interface
HX-5102 Disk Drive/Controller
Quick Disk QD-02

References

External links
The TI-99/4A Home Computer Page 64K bank-switched cartridge project

Computer-related introductions in 1983
American inventions
Computer connectors
Serial buses